Sickening Bliss is the fourth and final full-length album by Swedish goregrind band Regurgitate, released in 2006 by Relapse Records. For vinyl releases, there is the yellow splatter vinyl limited to 1000, red limited to 500, and clear limited to 100. There is also a censored cover that focuses on the woman's face and does not show her holding her intestines on a baby's blanket.

Track listing 
 "Bliss" - 0:35  
 "Abducens Eminence" - 0:57  
 "Euphoric State of Butchery" - 0:59  
 "Cocoon of Filth" - 0:49  
 "Putrid Serenity" - 1:44  
 "Tenderizing the Malformed" - 1:36  
 "Violent Necrophilic Climax" - 1:31  
 "Cavernous Sores" - 1:24  
 "Reborn in Latrinic Ecstasy" - 1:27  
 "Bleed on Me" - 2:22  
 "Gutrot Hogfrenzy" - 0:51  
 "Undying Lust for Cadaverous Molestation" - 1:25  
 "Battered with a Brick" - 1:12  
 "Devoured by Ghouls" - 1:13  
 "Addiction (an Unconditional Love for Blasphemous Perversions)" - 1:17  
 "(We Are) Sadistic Hateful Scum" - 2:08  
 "Worm Eater" - 1:35  
 "Perish in Blood" - 1:18  
 "Upheaval of Human Entrails" - 1:11  
 "Bathed in Feculence" - 1:21  
 "Bestial Sons of Devastation" - 1:18  
 "Defile" - 1:50  
 "Deterioration of Grated Genitals" - 1:20  
 "Excremental Investment" - 0:43  
 "Hacksaw Hysterectomy" - 0:55  
 "Catatonic Possession" - 2:54

Personnel
 Rikard Jansson - vocals
 Urban Skytt - guitar
 Glenn Sykes - bass
 Jocke Pettersson - drums

Production
Arranged by Regurgitate
Produced & recorded by Regurgitate & Patrik Jonsson
Mixed & mastered by Jocke "Necro-Nudist" Pettersson

References

2006 albums
Regurgitate (band) albums
Relapse Records albums